Lysophosphatidic acid (LPA) is a phospholipid derivative that can act as a signaling molecule.

Function

LPA acts as a potent mitogen due to its activation of three high-affinity G-protein-coupled receptors called LPAR1, LPAR2, and LPAR3 (also known as EDG2, EDG4, and EDG7). Additional, newly identified LPA receptors include LPAR4 (P2RY9, GPR23), LPAR5 (GPR92) and LPAR6 (P2RY5, GPR87).

Clinical significance
Because of its ability to stimulate cell proliferation, aberrant LPA-signaling has been linked to cancer in numerous ways.  Dysregulation of autotaxin or the LPA receptors can lead to hyperproliferation, which may contribute to oncogenesis and metastasis.

LPA may be the cause of pruritus (itching) in individuals with cholestatic (impaired bile flow) diseases.

GTPase activation
Downstream of LPA receptor activation, the small GTPase Rho can be activated, subsequently activating Rho kinase.  This can lead to the formation of stress fibers and cell migration through the inhibition of myosin light-chain phosphatase.

Metabolism
There are a number of potential routes to its biosynthesis, but the most well-characterized is by the action of a lysophospholipase D called autotaxin, which removes the choline group from lysophosphatidylcholine.

Lysophosphatidic acid is also an intermediate in the synthesis of phosphatidic acid.

See also

 Autotaxin
 GPR35
 Phosphatidic acid
 Sphingosine-1-phosphate
 Gintonin

References

Further reading

Phospholipids